The  was a Japanese samurai family who controlled the hereditary title of shikken (regent) of the Kamakura shogunate between 1203 and 1333. Despite the title, in practice the family wielded actual political power in Japan during this period compared to both the Kamakura shoguns, or the Imperial Court in Kyoto, whose authority was largely symbolic. The Hōjō are known for fostering Zen Buddhism and for leading the successful opposition to the Mongol invasions of Japan. Resentment at Hōjō rule eventually culminated in the overthrow of the clan and the establishment of the Ashikaga shogunate.

Bloodline
The Hōjō are alleged to have been an offshoot of the Taira of the Kanmu branch, originating in Izu Province.  They gained power by supporting the defeat of the Taira by intermarrying with and supporting Minamoto no Yoritomo in the Battle of Dan-no-ura. The Hōjō usurped power when Yoritomo died eighteen years later.

Rise to power

Hōjō Tokimasa helped Minamoto no Yoritomo, a son-in-law, defeat the forces of the Taira to become Japan's first shōgun.  Hōjō Masako, Tokimasa's daughter, was married to Yoritomo.  After the death of Yoritomo, Tokimasa became shikken (regent) to the child shōgun, thus effectively transferring control of the shogunate to his clan permanently. The Minamoto and the Imperial Princes became puppets and hostages of the Hōjō.

Early events
The Imperial court at Kyoto resented the decline in its authority during the Kamakura shogunate, and in 1221 the Jōkyū War broke out between retired Emperor Go-Toba and the second regent Hōjō Yoshitoki. The Hōjō forces easily won the war, and the imperial court was brought under the direct control of the shogunate. The shōguns constables gained greater civil powers, and the court was obliged to seek the shōguns approval for all of its actions. Although deprived of political power, the court retained extensive estates in Kyoto.

Several significant administrative achievements were made during the Hōjō regency. In 1225 the third regent Hōjō Yasutoki established the Council of State, providing opportunities for other military lords to exercise judicial and legislative authority at Kamakura. The Hōjō regent presided over the council, which was a successful form of collective leadership. The adoption of Japan's first military code of law—the Goseibai Shikimoku—in 1232 reflected the profound transition from court to militarized society. While legal practices in Kyoto were still based on 500-year-old Confucian principles, the new code was a highly legalistic document that stressed the duties of stewards and constables, provided means for settling land disputes, and established rules governing inheritances. It was clear and concise, stipulated punishments for violators of its conditions, and remained in effect for the next 635 years.

As might be expected, the literature of the time reflected the unsettled nature of the period. The Hōjōki describes the turmoil of the period in terms of the Buddhist concepts of impermanence and the vanity of human projects. The Heike monogatari narrated the rise and fall of the Taira, replete with tales of wars and samurai deeds. A second literary mainstream was the continuation of anthologies of poetry in the Shin Kokin Wakashū, of which twenty volumes were produced between 1201 and 1205.

List of Hōjō Shikken
 Hōjō Tokimasa (1138–1215) (r. 1203–1205)
 Hōjō Yoshitoki (1163–1224) (r. 1205–1224)
 Hōjō Yasutoki (1183–1242) (r. 1224–1242)
 Hōjō Tsunetoki (1224–1246) (r. 1242–1246)
 Hōjō Tokiyori (1227–1263) (r. 1246–1256)
 Hōjō Nagatoki (1229–1264) (r. 1256–1264)
 Hōjō Masamura (1205–1273) (r. 1264–1268)
 Hōjō Tokimune (1251–1284) (r. 1268–1284)
 Hōjō Sadatoki (1271–1311) (r. 1284–1301)
 Hōjō Morotoki (1275–1311) (r. 1301–1311)
 Hōjō Munenobu (1259–1312) (r. 1311–1312)
 Hōjō Hirotoki (1279–1315) (r. 1312–1315)
 Hōjō Mototoki (1286-1333) (r. 1315)
 Hōjō Takatoki (1303–1333) (r. 1316–1326)
 Hōjō Sadaaki (1278–1333) (r. 1326)
 Hōjō Moritoki (1295-1333) (r. 1327–1333)
 Hōjō Sadayuki (1302-1333) (r.1333)

Aside from the regents above, those who played an important role among the Hōjō clan are:
Hōjō Sanetoki
Hōjō Masako

References in media
 The Taiheiki (Japanese: 太平記) is a Japanese historical epic written in the late 14th century that details the fall of the Hōjō clan and rise of the Ashikaga, and the period of war (Nanboku-chō) between the Northern Court of Ashikaga Takauji in Kyoto, and the Southern Court of Emperor Go-Daigo in Yoshino, which forever splintered the Japanese Imperial Family.  Multiple modern films have been made based on the epic novel.
 The shape of the Triforce symbol from The Legend of Zelda game series looks similar to Hōjō clan's crest.
 In the visual novel Policenauts, the main plot deals with protagonist Jonathan Ingram locating his estranged wife's missing husband, Kenzō Hōjō. Hōjō's crest becomes an important gameplay element later on
 Hōjō Tokimune is the leader of the Japanese civilization in the strategy video game Sid Meier's Civilization VI.
 Hōjō Tokiyuki the son of the last Hōjō regent is main character of  manga by Yusei Matsui.

See also
 Later Hōjō clan
 Hōkoku-ji
 Shikken, Hōjō hereditary post
 Tokusō, Hōjō hereditary post
 Rensho, Hōjō hereditary post
 Rokuhara Tandai, Hōjō security force, Hōjō hereditary post
 Kamakura shogunate
 History of Japan
 Kanazawa Bunko
 Mongol invasions of Japan

References

 
Japanese clans